The 2014–15 Akron Zips men's basketball team represented the University of Akron during the 2014–15 NCAA Division I men's basketball season. The Zips, led by 11th year head coach Keith Dambrot, played their home games at the James A. Rhodes Arena as members of the East Division of the Mid-American Conference. They finished the season 21–14, 9–9 in MAC play to finish in fourth place in the East Division. They advanced to the semifinals of the MAC tournament where they lost to Buffalo. Despite having 21 wins, they were not invited to a postseason tournament.

Previous season
The Zips finished the season 21–13, 12–6 in MAC play to finish in second place in the East Division. They advanced to the semifinals of the MAC tournament where they lost to Western Michigan. They were invited to the CollegeInsider.com Tournament where they lost in the first round to IPFW.

Off season

Departures

Recruiting class of 2014

Recruiting class of 2015

Roster

Schedule and results
Source: 

|-
!colspan=9 style="background:#C29C41; color:#000E41;"| Exhibition

|-
!colspan=9 style="background:#C29C41; color:#000E41;"| Non-conference games

|-
!colspan=9 style="background:#C29C41; color:#000E41;"| Conference games

|-
!colspan=9 style="background:#C29C41; color:#000E41;"| MAC tournament

References

Akron Zips men's basketball seasons
Akron